This is a list of electoral region results for the Western Australian Legislative Council in the 2021 Western Australian state election.

Results summary

Distribution of seats

Results by electoral region

Agricultural

East Metropolitan

Mining and Pastoral

North Metropolitan

South Metropolitan

South West

References

Results of Western Australian elections
2021 elections in Australia